Sara Hayes (born 1982) is a camogie player, and senior scientist, winner of All Ireland camogie medals in 2002, 2006,2008 and 2009 and 2014,  in which year she got married between the All Ireland semi-final and final. She is the holder of All-Ireland Minor and Senior medals as well as Ashbourne Cup with U.C.C. and Senior "B" championship with her club and has also won National League and inter-provincial honours.

References

External links
 Official camogie website
 Denise Cronin’s championship diary in On The Ball Official Camogie Magazine
 https://web.archive.org/web/20091228032101/http://www.rte.ie/sport/gaa/championship/gaa_fixtures_camogie_oduffycup.html Fixtures and results] for the 2009 O'Duffy Cup
 All-Ireland Senior Camogie Championship: Roll of Honour
 Video highlights of 2009 championship Part One and part two
 Video Highlights of 2009 All Ireland Senior Final
 Report of All Ireland final in Irish Times Independent and Examiner

1982 births
Living people
Cork camogie players
UCC camogie players